Friends and Neighbours is a 1959 British comedy film directed by Gordon Parry and starring Arthur Askey, Megs Jenkins and Peter Illing.

Plot
At the height of the Cold War, a working-class British family have to entertain two visitors from Russia.

Cast
 Arthur Askey ...  Albert Grimshaw
 Megs Jenkins ...  Lily Grimshaw
 Peter Illing ...  Nukita
 Tilda Thamar ...  Olga
 Reginald Beckwith ...  Wilf Holmes
 June Whitfield ...  Doris Holmes
 Danny Ross ...  Sebastian Green
 Catherine Feller ...  Susan Grimshaw
 Jess Conrad ...  Buddy Fisher
 George A. Cooper ...  Wheeler, George
 Max Robertson ...  TV announcer
 Arthur Howard ...  Rev. Dobson
 Eynon Evans ...  Shopkeeper
 Linda Castle ...  Gloria Stockwell
 Ken Parry ...  Sid
 Steven Scott ...  Bus superintendent
 Richard Walter ...  Bus inspector
 Donald Bisset ...  Porter
 Anatole Smirnoff ...  Russian embassy official
 Laurence Herder ...  1st Russian
 Paul Bogdan ...  2nd Russian
 Alan Scott ...  3rd Russian
 Dudley Jones ...  Sam
 Robert Checksfield ...  Policeman
 Ruth Kettlewell ...  Woman in club
 Camilla Hasse ...  1st Girl
 Julia Sutton ...  2nd Girl
 Pauline Shepherd ...  3rd Girl
 Judy Cornwell ...  4th Girl

References

External links

1959 films
Films directed by Gordon Parry
1959 comedy films
British comedy films
British films based on plays
1950s English-language films
1950s British films